Hello is an extended play (EP) by pop music duo Karmin. It was released on May 4, 2012 through Epic Records and distributed through Sony Music Entertainment.

Concept
Both Heidemann and Noonan worked to maintain original songs and ideas, while working toward mainstream and pop music. They cited L.A. Reid's understanding of their musical background to be helpful in this process.

Album title and artwork
Through Twitter, the duo revealed that their debut studio album would officially be called HELLO. Heidemann explained to BeatWeek: "We thought it was a perfect title, because it’s our introduction album. When you hear the songs in a row, you’re going to hear our story." The artwork depicts the two band members sitting on the base of a billboard with "Hello" written under them.

Critical reception

The album was panned by some music critics. Writing in The New York Times, Jon Caramanica critiqued Karmin as an act whose fame came from "assaulting the songs of others, performing glib and highly stylized YouTube covers that inadvertently doubled as sketch comedy" and found Heidemann's rapping in her own material "intricate and deeply irritating". Jody Rosen of Rolling Stone dubbed it "one of the most aggressively obnoxious debut albums in recent memory", with "Brokenhearted", for example, being "catchy" but "Heidemann's daffiness and horrendous rapping spoil[ing] the broth every time".

On the other hand, Gerrick D. Kennedy wrote on the Los Angeles Times music blog: "The disc brims with the swagged-out pop/hip-hop that made [Karmin] YouTube darlings, as collaborators Stargate, Benny Blanco, Tricky Stewart and Dr. Luke deliver slick, radio-ready productions."

The album debuted at #18 on the Billboard 200 and #33 on the Canadian Albums Chart.

Singles
Karmin and Epic released "Brokenhearted" as the first single from Hello, which impacted radio February 7, 2012. It subsequently became their first song to enter Billboard Hot 100, where it peaked at #16. It also reached the #1 spot on Hot Dance Club Play, #12 Pop Digital Songs, and #10 Mainstream Top 40. It was certified as a platinum digital single (1,000,000 unit sales) by the RIAA as announced by Karmin and their management on Twitter and Facebook in early August 2012.

"Hello" impacted radio stations on July 31, 2012 as the EP's second single, which debuted #89 on the Billboard Hot 100, marking their second single to chart in the US. So far, the single is currently peaking at #62 in the US. It is also charting in New Zealand, Australia and in many other countries.

Promotional singles
"I Told You So" was released as the first and only promotional single on May 9, 2012.

Track listing

(*) Denotes co-producer

Sample credits
"Too Many Fish" interpolates "Too Many Fish in the Sea" as performed by The Marvelettes, and written by Norman Whitfield and Eddie Holland.
"Hello" interpolates "Smells Like Teen Spirit" by Nirvana.

References

External links

2012 EPs
Albums produced by Cirkut
Albums produced by Stargate
Albums produced by Tricky Stewart
Epic Records EPs
Karmin albums